The Bear Creek meteorite, formerly known as the Colorado meteorite, is an octahedrite meteorite that was found in 1866 in Jefferson County, Colorado, United States.

See also
 Glossary of meteoritics

References

External links
 Meteoritical Bulletin: Entry for Bear Creek - Lunar and Planetary Institute
 Map of Colorado meteorite locations (PDF)
 IMCA EoM: Bear Creek (Iron, IIIAB)

1866 in the United States
Iron meteorites
Jefferson County, Colorado
Meteorites found in the United States
Asteroidal achondrites
Geology of Colorado